Ñemitỹrã. Revista Multilingüe de Lengua, Sociedad y Educación is a biannual peer-reviewed academic journal published by the Higher Institute of Languages, School of Philosophy, National University of Asunción. It contains articles on language, society, and education. The editor-in-chief is Valentina Canese Caballero. 

The journal is published in February and August. The articles are in Spanish, Guarani, English, French, German, or Portuguese.

Abstracting and indexing 
The journal is abstracted and indexed in:
 Crossref
 Google Scholar
 LatinREV
 ROAD

References

External links
 
 

Linguistics journals
Education journals
Multilingual journals
Publications established in 2019
Biannual journals
Universidad Nacional de Asunción